Robert Beno Cialdini (born April 27, 1945) is an American psychologist and academic. He is the Regents' Professor Emeritus of Psychology and Marketing at Arizona State University and was a visiting professor of marketing, business and psychology at Stanford University.

Education
Cialdini received his Bachelor of Science degree from the University of Wisconsin–Milwaukee in June 1967. He then went on to Graduate studies in Social Psychology at the University of North Carolina and earned his PhD in June 1970 and received Postgraduate training in social psychology at Columbia University. He has held visiting scholar appointments at Ohio State University, the University of California, the Annenberg School of Communications, and the Graduate School of Business of Stanford University.  Currently, Cialdini is Regents’ Professor Emeritus of Psychology and Marketing at Arizona State University.

Work
He is best known for his 1984 book on persuasion and marketing, Influence: The Psychology of Persuasion.  It was based on three "undercover" years applying for and training at used car dealerships, fund-raising organizations, and telemarketing firms to observe real-life situations of persuasion. He found that influence is based on six key principles: reciprocity, commitment and consistency, social proof, authority, liking, scarcity. In 2016 he proposed a seventh principle. He called it the unity principle. The more we identify ourselves with others, the more we are influenced by these others.

The book has sold over five million copies and has been translated into 41 languages. It has been listed on the New York Times Best Seller list and Fortune lists it in their "75 Smartest Business Books".   It is mentioned in 50 Psychology Classics.

One of Cialdini's other books, Yes! 50 Scientifically Proven Ways to Be Persuasive, was a New York Times Bestseller; and another of his books, The Small BIG: Small changes that spark a big influence, was a Times Book of the year. Cialdini's most recent book is Pre-suasion, which was published in 2016.

The Robert B. Cialdini prize from the Society for Personality and Social Psychology is named after him in honor of psychological research that demonstrates societal relevance using field methods. He was elected a member of the National Academy of Sciences in April 2019.

Projects
Cialdini was hired alongside many other behavioural scientists for the Barack Obama presidential campaign, 2012. He also advised in the early stages of the Hillary Clinton presidential campaign, 2016.

Selected publications

 Influence: The Psychology of Persuasion  (William Morrow e Company, 1984), 
 New and Expanded edition (Harper Business, 2021), 
 Influence:  Science and Practice (Allyn & Bacon, 2000),  4th edition (Allyn and Bacon, 2001), 
 5th edition (Allyn and Bacon, 2008), 
 Yes! 50 Scientifically Proven Ways to be Persuasive with Noah J. Goldstein and Steve J. Martin (Simon and Schuster, 2008), .
 The Small BIG: Small changes that spark a big influence with Steve J. Martin and Noah J. Goldstein (Grand Central Publishing, 2014), 
 Pre-Suasion: A Revolutionary Way to Influence and Persuade'' (Simon & Schuster, 2016),

References

External links
 

1945 births
Living people
American people of Italian descent
Arizona State University faculty
Social psychologists
Persuasion theorists
Marketing theorists
Members of the United States National Academy of Sciences